James Marvin Barrier (August 7, 1940 – August 26, 2000) was an American alpine ski racer and a member of the United States Ski Team. He competed in two events at the 1960 Winter Olympics.

Born and raised in Wallace, Idaho, Barrier learned to race at nearby Lookout Pass.

Olympic results

References

1940 births
2000 deaths
American male alpine skiers
Olympic alpine skiers of the United States
Alpine skiers at the 1960 Winter Olympics
People from Wallace, Idaho
Sportspeople from Idaho